Toni Tislar (born May 9, 1967 in Jesenice, Yugoslavia) is a retired Slovenian professional ice hockey player.

Career

Club career
In 1983, Tislar made his debut in the Yugoslav Ice Hockey League with HK Kranjska Gora. He won the Yugoslav Ice Hockey League title with HK Acroni Jesenice in 1988 and 1989. He played with HDD Olimpija Ljubljana from 1991–1995, HK MK Bled from 1995–1997, and for 2002–03. From 2003 until his retirement in 2005, he played again for HK Acroni Jesenice.

International career
Tislar participated in 10 IIHF World Championships with Yugoslavia and Slovenia. In 144 international games, he scored 46 goals and 42 assists.

References

1967 births
Yugoslav ice hockey players
Slovenian ice hockey players
HK Acroni Jesenice players
HDD Olimpija Ljubljana players
Living people
Sportspeople from Jesenice, Jesenice